Price Chopper may refer to:

United States
 Price Chopper and Market 32 Supermarkets, a supermarket chain based in Schenectady, New York, with stores in eastern United States
 Price Chopper Tour Championship, a golf tournament in the Albany, New York, area that has operated until several different names
 Price Chopper (supermarket), an association of supermarket chains based in Kansas City, Missouri, with stores in the central United States
 Price Chopper 400, a stock car race in Kansas City, Kansas, that has operated until several different names
 Price Chopper (Oregon), a defunct supermarket chain based in Eugene, Oregon, now part of the Market of Choice brand

Elsewhere
 Price Chopper (Canada), a defunct supermarket chain in the Ontario area that operated from the 1990s to 2020, now operating as FreshCo
 Price Chopper (New Zealand), a defunct supermarket group that operated from 1987 to 2004, under the Woolworths brand

See also
 Price Cutter Park, a baseball stadium in Christian County, Missouri
 Price Cutter Charity Championship, a golf tournament held in Springfield, Missouri